The King George VI Reservoir sits between Stanwell Moor and Staines upon Thames, south-west of Heathrow, England. It is between Staines Moor and a north–south road abutting the Staines Reservoirs. The reservoir was opened in November 1947 and named after the then reigning monarch George VI. It is owned by Thames Water.

Construction and statistics
It occupies  and holds 3,493 million gallons (15,880,000 m3) or, per The Times, 4,466 million gallons. The enclosing bank crest measures 5.23 km. Like its Lower Thames siblings, it is of earthen dam build: a puddled clay lining and embankments from materials excavated on site, particularly ballast (heavier aggregates). It has been built-up from dry land as the eastern Thames Basin lacked sufficiently watered, largely unpopulated, agriculturally unprized vales to be dammed near to which conveniently coal-supplied treatment works and pipes to London could be built.

A tendered bid for the work – at £1,292,000,  – was accepted in July 1937. The contractor was John Mowlem and Co. Limited.

World War II use when empty
The reservoir was completed in 1939 but was left empty due to the outbreak of the Second World War. It is reputed that a mock Clapham Junction railway station was built inside to confuse the Luftwaffe. The reservoir was used for fog dispersal experiments for an aircraft landing in fog or smog technique, FIDO. It was formally opened by King George VI on 7 November 1947.

Local economic history
The land purchase was likely connected with gravel extraction locally. Four such firms were digging for aggregates in Stanwell in 1956, employing nearly 100 people.

Operation, sheep and notable birds
This and the Staines Reservoirs, built 1902, receive their input from the Thames at Hythe End, Wraysbury above Bell Weir Lock and the mouth of the Colne Brook. The reservoir's inlet valve tower is south, north of a pumping station; the outlet one is east, being gravity-fed. Input and output are to and from the Staines Reservoirs Aqueduct, feeding the Water Treatment Works at Kempton Park and another at Hampton.

To ease inspection of banks, a flock of sheep is kept on them which keeps them close-cropped.

It is part of the Staines Moor Site of Special Scientific Interest. The reservoirs carry (are habitats for) nationally large wintering populations of tufted ducks, pochard, goosander and goldeneye.

See also
London water supply infrastructure
List of SSSIs in Surrey

References

External links
 Surrey County Council map

Reservoirs in Surrey
Thames Water reservoirs
Drinking water reservoirs in England